Paul R. Eberle and Shirley Eberle are American authors. Paul Eberle is a former writer for the Los Angeles Free Press.

Publications
In the 1970s, the Eberles published a pornographic publication called Finger.

In 1972 they wrote The Adventures of Mrs. Pussycat, a children's book illustrated by Anthony De Rosa.

In the 1970s, they published the pornographic underground paper L.A. Star, sold in news racks throughout Los Angeles and other cities and states.

They published The Politics of Child Abuse in 1986. It discusses false allegation of child sexual abuse in the day care sex abuse hysteria.

In 1993 they published The Abuse of Innocence  on the McMartin preschool trial. Alan Dershowitz called the book "... a wake-up call to those who believe that prosecutors and their experts can be trusted to do justice in the emotional context of child abuse."

In 2006, Paul Eberle published a book on road rage called Terror on the Highway.

Books
Paul and Shirley Eberle, The Adventures of Mrs. Pussycat, illustrated by Anthony DeRosa, Prentice-Hall (1972) 
Paul and Shirley Eberle, The Politics of Child Abuse (1986) 
Paul and Shirley Eberle, The Abuse of Innocence: The McMartin Preschool Trial (1993) 
Paul Eberle, Terror on the Highway: Rage on America's Roads (2006) ISBN 
Paul Eberle (writing under the pseudonym Swan Egan DeButz), The Collected Poems of Swan Egan DeButz  Price, Stern, Sloan.

References

American alternative journalists
American pornographers
American non-fiction writers
Day care sexual abuse allegations in the United States
Living people
Married couples
Eberle, Paul and Shirley
Writing duos
Year of birth missing (living people)